Delos is one of the most important mythological, historical and archaeological sites in Greece.

Deloose may also refer to:

People with the name
(Alphabetical by surname)
 Delos R. Ashley (1828–1873), American politician
 Delos W. Baxter (1857–1918), American politician
 Delos Davis (1846–1915), Canadian lawyer
 Shaquil Delos (born 1999), French footballer
 Delos Drake (1886–1965), American baseball player
 Delos Carleton Emmons (1888–1965), United States Army general
 Delos D. Harriman, fictional character in the works of Robert A. Heinlein
 Delos Jewkes (1895–1984), American bass singer and actor
 Delos W. Lovelace (1894–1967), American novelist
 Lawrence Delos Miles (1904–1985), American engineer
 Delos Bennett Sackett (1822–1885), United States Army general
 Alex C. Delos Santos (born 1967), Filipino poet
 Robert Delos Santos (1928-2020), French diplomat and military personnel
 Delos Thurber (1916–1987), American athlete

Arts, entertainment, and media
 Delos (park), a fictional amusement park
 Delos International, an independent record label
 Delos Productions, an American classical record label specializing in Russian music

Other uses
 Delos (genus), a genus of medium-sized predatory air-breathing land snails
 Delos Mountain, a mountain located in Boeotia, Greece
 Sailing SV Delos, a YouTube channel
 Delos or delos, a Philippine linguistic corruption of the Spanish nobiliary particle or prepositional particle "de los" [The same corruption occurs in the use of "de la" and "de las" as well as "de" (thus pandesal) in the country]

See also
 
 

Masculine given names